Geodetic astronomy or astronomical geodesy (astro-geodesy) is the application of astronomical methods into geodetic networks and other technical projects of geodesy.

Applications
The most important applications are:
 Establishment of geodetic datum systems (e.g. ED50) or at expeditions
 apparent places of stars, and their proper motions 
 precise astronomical navigation
 astro-geodetic geoid determination
 modelling the rock densities of the topography and of geological layers in the subsurface
 Monitoring of the Earth rotation and polar wandering
 Contribution to the time system of physics and geosciences

Measuring techniques
Important measuring techniques are:
 Latitude determination and longitude determination, by theodolites, tacheometers, astrolabes or zenith cameras
 time and star positions by observation of star transits, e.g. by meridian circles (visual, photographic or CCD)
 Azimuth determination
 for the exact orientation of geodetic networks
 for mutual transformations between terrestrial and space methods
 for improved accuracy by means of "Laplace points" at special fixed points
 Vertical deflection determination and their use
 in geoid determination
 in mathematical reduction of very precise networks
 for geophysical and geological purposes (see above)
 Modern spatial methods
 VLBI with radio sources (quasars)
 Astrometry of stars by scanning satellites like Hipparcos or the future Gaia.

The accuracy of these methods depends on the instrument and its spectral wavelength, the measuring or scanning method, the time amount (versus economy), the atmospheric situation, the stability of the surface resp. the satellite, on mechanical and temperature effects to the instrument, on the experience and skill of the observer, and on the accuracy of the physical-mathematical models.

Therefore, the accuracy reaches from 60" (navigation, ~1 mile) to 0,001" and better (a few cm; satellites, VLBI), e.g.:
 angles (vertical deflections and azimuths) ±1" up to 0,1"
 geoid determination & height systems ca. 5 cm up to 0,2 cm
 astronomical lat/long and star positions ±1" up to 0,01"
 HIPPARCOS star positions ±0,001"
 VLBI quasar positions and Earth's rotation poles 0,001 to 0,0001" (cm...mm)

Astrogeodetic leveling is a local geoid determination method based on vertical deflection measurements. Given a starting value at one point, determining the geoid undulations for an area becomes a matter for simple integration of vertical deflection, as it represents the horizontal spatial gradient of the geoid undulation.

See also
 Arc measurement
 Astronomy, stellar triangulation, spherical trigonometry
 Satellite, electro-optics, CCD
 Satellite geodesy
 Space geodesy
 Triangulation, tacheometer
 Astro navigation, Karl Ramsayer
 Astrometry
 Spherical astronomy
 Surveying
 Zenith camera

References

External links

Geodesy
Astronomical sub-disciplines